Libbiano may refer to:

Libbiano, Peccioli, a village in the province of Pisa, Italy
Libbiano, Pomarance, a village in the province of Pisa, Italy